Luo Zundian (died March 19, 1860) was a Chinese provincial governor who ended several rebellions, but was forced to commit suicide in the second rout of the Jiangnan Battalion in Hangzhou when the Taiping forces conquered the city.

Life
Luo was born in  Susong County, Anhui. From very early in life, he showed remarkable ability, and he became a shengyuan in the imperial examination system. In 1835, he obtained jinshi degree, the highest level in the Imperial examination system. Shortly after this the central provinces of the empire were invaded by the Taiping rebels, and he raised a regiment of militia.

References
Draft History of Qing

1860 deaths
Qing dynasty politicians from Anhui
Qing military personnel killed in action
Politicians from Anqing
Political office-holders in Hubei
Political office-holders in Fujian
Political office-holders in Zhejiang
Suicides in the Qing dynasty
Suicides by poison
Year of birth unknown
People of the Taiping Rebellion